The 1978–79 Greek Football Cup was the 37th edition of the Greek Football Cup.

Tournament details

Totally 58 teams participated, 18 from Alpha Ethniki and 40 from Beta Ethniki. It was held in 6 rounds, included final. That year was established for first time the two-legged tie on a home and away basis, for the quarter-finals and the semi-finals, according to the model of European cups.

Up to those matches, the most exciting games were on the third round. From the 8 matches, only 2 were decided after 90 minutes. In matches between Aris and Panathinaikos and Olympiacos and PAOK, the home teams qualified on penalty shootout. Aris had earlier eliminated Iraklis in similar fashion.

The final was contested by the champion of that season AEK Athens and Panionios, who qualified for a Greek Cup Final after 12 years. Panionios advanced by eliminating both Aris, in quarter-finals, with a 5–1 home victory after their 5–2 away defeat, and Olympiacos, in semi-finals, with away goals rule. The surprise of the underdog was completed in the final, held at Karaiskakis Stadium, on 9 June 1979, where Panionios won 3–1, claiming their first title in history.

Calendar

Knockout phase
Each tie in the knockout phase, apart from the first three rounds and the final, was played over two legs, with each team playing one leg at home. The team that scored more goals on aggregate over the two legs advanced to the next round. If the aggregate score was level, the away goals rule was applied, i.e. the team that scored more goals away from home over the two legs advanced. If away goals were also equal, then extra time was played. The away goals rule was again applied after extra time, i.e. if there were goals scored during extra time and the aggregate score was still level, the visiting team advanced by virtue of more away goals scored. If no goals were scored during extra time, the winners were decided by a penalty shoot-out. In the first three rounds and the final, which were played as a single match, if the score was level at the end of normal time, extra time was played, followed by a penalty shoot-out if the score was still level.The mechanism of the draws for each round is as follows:
There are no seedings, and teams from the same group can be drawn against each other.

First round

|}

Bracket

Second round

|}

Round of 16

|}

Quarter-finals

|}

Semi-finals

|}

Final

The 35th Greek Cup Final was played at the Karaiskakis Stadium.

References

External links
Greek Cup 1978-79 at RSSSF

Greek Football Cup seasons
Greek Cup
Cup